Mallepoovu or Malle Poovu is a 1978 Telugu-language drama film directed by V. Madhusudan Rao. It is remake of 1957 Hindi film Pyaasa produced and directed by Guru Dutt.

It is musical film with lyrics penned by Veturi and Arudra and music scored by K. Chakravarthy. The songs are voiced by P. Susheela, S. P. Balasubrahmanyam and Vani Jayaram.

Plot 
The plot follows the story of an unsuccessful poet who is deemed as useless by the society.

Cast 
 Shobhan Babu
 Jayasudha
 Lakshmi
 Rao Gopal Rao
 Sridhar
 Pandaribai

Soundtrack 
 "Mallepoovula Vasantham Maa Thotakochindi" (Lyrics: Veturi; Singer: S. P. Balasubrahmanyam; Cast: Sobhan Babu)
 "Chaka Chaka Saage Chakkani Bullemma" (Lyrics: Veeturi; Singer: S. P. Balasubrahmanyam, P. Susheela; Cast: Sobhan Babu, Jayasudha)
 "Chinna Maata Oka Chinna Maata" (Lyrics: Veturi; Singer: P. Susheela; Cast: Lakshmi, Sobhan Babu)
 "Evvaro Evvaro Ee Neraaladigevarevvaro" (Lyrics: Veturi; Singer: S. P. Balasubrahmanyam; Cast: Sobhan Babu)
 "Nuvvu Vasthavani Brundhavani Aasaga Choosenayya Krishnayya" (Lyrics: Veeturi; Singer: Vani Jayaram; Cast: Lakshmi, Pandari Bai, Sobhan Babu)
 "Oho Oho Lalitha Naa Prema Kavitha" (Lyrics: Veturi; Singer: S. P. Balasubrahmanyam, P. Susheela; Cast: Sobhan Babu, Jayasudha)
 "O Priya Marumalliya Kanna Thellanidhi" (Lyrics: Arudra; Singer: S.P.Balasubramanyam; Cast: Sobhanbabu, Jayasudha)
 "Evariki Telusu Chithikina Manasu" (Lyrics: Veturi; Singer: S.P.Balasubramanyam; Cast: Sobhanbabu, Jayasudha, Sridhar)
 "Jumbamba Jumbamba Bamba Bamba Jum" (Lyrics: Arudra; Singer: K. Chakravarthy; Cast : Raogopalarao)
 "Brathikunna Chachinatte Ee Sanghamlo" (Lyrics: Acharya Aatreya; Singer: S. P. Balasubrahmanyam, V. Ramakrishna, P. Susheela; Cast : Sobhan Babu, Sridhar, Lakshmi, Jayasudha, Rao Gopalarao)

Box office 
 The film ran for 100 days in Visakhapatnam.

References

External links 
 
 Listen to Malle Poovu songs at Ragalahari.com

1978 films
Films directed by V. Madhusudhana Rao
Films scored by K. Chakravarthy
Telugu remakes of Hindi films
1970s Telugu-language films